Lieutenant-General William Angus Watt, CMM, CD is a Canadian retired air force general who was Chief of the Air Staff from 2007 to 2009. He formerly served as the president and chief executive officer of the Canadian Air Transport Security Authority.

Career
Watt joined the Canadian Forces in 1972 and, after graduating from the Royal Military College Saint-Jean in 1977, trained as a pilot before flying Sea King helicopters.

He served as commanding officer of 423 Maritime Helicopter Squadron before becoming commander of Joint Task Force Southwest Asia (for Operation Apollo) in 2002, director of operations at NORAD in 2004 and then deputy commander of the International Security Assistance Force in Afghanistan in 2006. He went on to be Chief of the Air Staff in 2007 before retiring in 2009.

He became president and chief executive officer of the Canadian Air Transport Security Authority in 2012.

Honours

  He was a qualified RCAF Pilot and as such wore the Royal Air Canadian Forces Pilot Wings.

References

|-

|-

Living people
Royal Military College Saint-Jean alumni
Canadian Forces Air Command generals
Commanders of the Order of Military Merit (Canada)
Year of birth missing (living people)